is a Japanese lyricist born 11 December 1957 in Gifu Prefecture, Japan, though he considers Tokyo to be his hometown. Beginning with participation in the Yamaha Popular Song Contests, he made his debut writing the lyrics for the 1981 Chage and Aska album .

Matsui then began writing lyrics for groups such as Anzen Chitai, Kyosuke Himuro, and others, becoming one of the more popular lyricists for a variety of rock bands. He has now written the lyrics for over 2000 songs. Since the late 1980s, most of the lyrics for the music released by Anzen Chitai has been written by Matsui.

As of today, Matsui is under the management of Avex Group, Japan's biggest independent record label. He serves as a resident songwriter for the said company.

Works
Matsui's works include the following:

Boyfriend
"Be My Shine"

Chage and Aska

Anzen Chitai

Atsuko Enomoto
Be My Angel

Shōko Inoue

Hiromi Iwasaki

Yoshie Kashiwabara

Shizuka Kudo
"Daite Kuretara Ii no ni"
"Koi Hitoyo"
"Kuchibiru Kara Biyaku"
"Boya Boya Dekinai"
"Mechakucha ni Naite Shimaitai"
"Koe o Kikasete"
"Watashi wa Knife"
"Anata Shika Inai Desho"

MIE
"Never" (Japanese-language cover of the Moving Pictures song from the Footloose soundtrack)

Akina Nakamori
"Gekka"
"Hajimete Deatta Hi no Yō ni"

Miho Nakayama
"Semi-sweet Magic"
"Megamitachi no Bōken"
Jeweluna

Megumi Ogata

Project DMM

Shanadoo
King Kong

References

External links
  by Avex Group

1957 births
Japanese lyricists
Musicians from Tokyo
Living people
Avex Group people